Caronno may refer to several places:

Caronno Pertusella, Varese, Lombardy, Italy
Caronno Varesino, Varese, Lombardy, Italy